Ernst Nobs (14 July 1886, in Seedorf, Bern – 15 March 1957) was a Swiss politician.

He was the mayor of Zürich from 1942 to 1944. He was elected to the Swiss Federal Council on 15 December 1943, as the first member of the Social Democratic Party. He handed over office on 31 December 1951.

During his time in office he was responsible for the Department of Finance and he was President of the Confederation in 1949.

References

External links
 
 
 

1886 births
1957 deaths
People from Seeland District
Swiss Calvinist and Reformed Christians
Social Democratic Party of Switzerland politicians
Members of the Federal Council (Switzerland)
Finance ministers of Switzerland
Members of the National Council (Switzerland)
Mayors of Zürich
Swiss magazine founders